Eridge Green is a  biological Site of Special Scientific Interest north-east of Crowborough in East Sussex. It is part of the  Eridge Rocks nature reserve, which is managed by Sussex Wildlife Trust.

This is ancient woodland on clay with outcrops of sandstone which form cliffs up to ten metres high. Flora on the rocks include Tunbridge filmy fern, the mosses Dicranum scottianum and Orthodontium gracile and the liverworts Scapania umbrosa, Scapania gracilis and Harpanthus scutatus.

There is access from Warren Farm Lane.

References

Sussex Wildlife Trust
Sites of Special Scientific Interest in East Sussex
Frant